The 1954 Pacific hurricane season featured below-average activity, with eleven tropical storms identified. The season officially started on May 15 and lasted until November 30. These dates conventionally delimit the period of each year when most tropical cyclones form in the Pacific basin. The majority of the year's storm remained offshore and caused little to no adverse impact on land. However, a tropical storm in October brought flooding rain to Mexico and Guatemala that left five people dead and thousands homeless. An unknown disease in the storm's wake killed a further 35 people.

The relative lack of activity is a byproduct of limited monitoring tools at the time. In 1954, Pacific hurricanes were only able to be identified by ship reports (either post-trip logs or in situ transmissions) and coastal observations. No more than eight coastal cities reported regular observations. Additionally, only two cities, Empalme, Sonora, and Mazatlán, Sinaloa, launched radiosondes—a key factor in detecting tropical cyclones at the time—further limiting detection capabilities.

Systems

Tropical Storm One 

On June 17, an area of low pressure was identified on surface weather maps just off the coast of Guatemala. The following day, the system was classified as a tropical storm approximately 210 mi (340 km) southwest of Guatemala City. Tracking generally northwest, the system acquired maximum sustained winds of 50 mph (85 km/h). On June 20–21, the storm moved parallel to the Mexican coastline before turning north on June 22. It was last noted offshore on this day, approximately 50 mi (85 km) south of Lázaro Cárdenas, Michoacán.

Tropical Storm Two 

Tropical Storm Two existed from July 10 to July 16.

Hurricane Three 

This hurricane made landfall in the Baja California Peninsula.

Remnant moisture from this system led to rainfall over Arizona and California, with accumulations reaching  in the latter.

Hurricane Four 

Hurricane Four existed from July 25 to August 1.

Tropical Storm Five 

Tropical Storm Five existed from September 2 to September 9.

Tropical Storm Six 

Tropical Storm Six existed from September 5 to September 9.

Tropical Storm Seven 

Tropical Storm Seven existed from September 15 to September 21.

Tropical Storm Eight 

Tropical Storm Eight existed from September 21 to September 27.

Hurricane Nine 

Hurricane Nine existed from September 27 to October 1.

Tropical Storm Ten 

Tropical Storm Ten existed from October 12 to October 14. Surface weather maps indicate the system had a central pressure of at most 1000 mbar (hPa; 29.53 inHg) on October 13.

Heavy rains from the storm affected much of Mexico, impacting areas as far north as Tampico. Flooding along the Pánuco River rendered 160 people homeless; electrical service and water supplies were disrupted. The towns of Panuco and Revenadero were largely destroyed; thousands of acres of crops were submerged and livestock loss was severe. Five people died due to flooding in coastal towns near Tampico. An unidentified diseased in the storm's wake claimed 35 lives. Aid workers traveled along the swollen Pánuco River to distribute supplies, including food and snake bite serum. Severe flooding also plagued Guatemala, with thousands rendered homeless.

Hurricane Eleven 

Hurricane Eleven existed from October 26 to November 1.

See also 

1954 Pacific typhoon season
1954 Atlantic hurricane season
 Australian region cyclone seasons: 1953–54 1954–55
 South Pacific cyclone seasons: 1953–54 1954–55
 South-West Indian Ocean cyclone seasons: 1953–54 1954–55

Notes

References 

 
Pacific hurricane seasons